The participation of Vietnam in the ABU TV Song Festival has occurred eleven times since the inaugural ABU TV Song Festival began in 2012. Since their début in 2012, the Vietnamese entry has been organised by the national broadcaster Vietnam Television (VTV).

Participation overview

Hostings

References 

Countries at the ABU Song Festival